Spring Lake is an unincorporated community in North Branch Township, Isanti County, Minnesota, United States.

Spring Lake Road NE also serves the community.

Spring Lake is eight miles east of Cambridge.

References

 Official State of Minnesota Highway Map – 2011/2012 edition
 Mn/DOT map of Isanti County – 2011 edition

Unincorporated communities in Isanti County, Minnesota
Unincorporated communities in Minnesota